Indian Birds is a bi-monthly ornithology journal/newsletter that was established in 2004. It was formerly published under the heading Newsletter for Ornithologists for one year. It publishes articles on identification, distribution, migration, conservation and taxonomy, apart from reports of significant ornithological sightings and events. Published from Hyderabad, the publication is owned by New Ornis Foundation.

Overview
In 2006, the Bugun liocichla, a new bird species from Arunachal Pradesh was described by Ramana Athreya in this journal. The description of the bird carried in the journal was made without the collection of a type specimen as they were too few to risk killing one. Though this practice was not unprecedented, with four prior instances, the pure charisma of the bird together with this practice created a controversy in the scientific and conservation community on the costs and benefits of this approach

The journal has published 683 articles in its first eight volumes. Nearly 125 of these articles are referenced in the text of Handbook of the Birds of the World online.
In 2016, Indian Birds published the official bird checklist for the country

Aasheesh Pittie has been the editor of this journal since its inception. Zafar Futehally, who founded Newsletter for Birdwatchers in 1960, served as editor emeritus until his death in 2013.
  
The first south Asian records of the following species were published in this journal.
Cory's shearwater, Calonectris borealis
Sabine's gull, Xema sabini
Blue-winged pitta, Pitta moluccensis
Black-browed bushtit, Aegithalos bonvaloti
Crested tit-warbler, Leptopoecile elegans
Yunnan nuthatch, Sitta yunnanensis
Chinese thrush Zoothera mupinensis
Mugimaki flycatcher, Ficedula mugimaki
Tristram's bunting, Emberiza tristrami

The first national records of the following species were published in this journal.
Short-tailed shearwater, Ardenna tenuirostris (India and Bangladesh)
Long-tailed jaeger, Stercorarius longicaudus
Woodchat shrike, Lanius senator
Asian stubtail, Urosphena squameiceps

Apart from publishing pure novelties, the journal has published opinion pieces.

Some of the special issues published include
Andaman and Nicobar Islands
MigrantWatch
Bhutan
Arunachal Pradesh
Gujarat
Pelagic birds

See also
 List of ornithology journals

References

External links 

2004 establishments in Andhra Pradesh
Bi-monthly magazines published in India
Science and technology magazines published in India
Journals and magazines relating to birding and ornithology
Magazines established in 2004
Mass media in Hyderabad, India